James Duckworth was the defending champion but chose not to defend his title.

Tseng Chun-hsin won the title after defeating Borna Gojo 6–4, 7–5 in the final.

Seeds

Draw

Finals

Top half

Bottom half

References

External links
Main draw
Qualifying draw

Bengaluru Open - 1
2022 Singles